Estadio Tomás Oroz Gaytán was a stadium in Ciudad Obregón, Mexico. It was primarily used for baseball and served as the home stadium for Yaquis de Obregón. It holds 13,000 people.

A new baseball venue, the Estadio Yaquis, was inaugurated on 12 October 2016, by then-governor of Sonora, Claudia Pavlovich Arellano.

References

Tomas Oroz Gaytan
Sports venues in Sonora